Lava is a color that is a shade of red. It is named after the color of volcanic lava.

This is the color (color #CF1020, shown at right) of fresh lava pouring out of a volcano.

The first recorded use of lava as a color name in English was in 1891.

Variations of lava

Dark lava

The color dark lava is the color of lava that has cooled and begun to congeal into igneous rock.

The normalized color coordinates for dark lava are identical to taupe, which came into use as a color name in English in the early 19th century;

References

See also

 List of colors

Shades of red